Lucas Sithole (1931-1994) was a South African sculptor best known for his work in mainly indigenous woods, as well as for his sculptures in bronze, stone and other media.

He was born on 15 November 1931, in Springs, Transvaal, Republic of South Africa; he died on 8 May 1994, in Pongola Transvaal, Republic of South Africa. Born of a Zulu father and a Swazi mother; he was married, had seven children. He lived in Kwa-Thema, Springs, Transvaal, until 1981, thereafter near Pongola on the Swaziland/Mozambique border. He never travelled beyond the South African borders, except to Lesotho, Namibia and Swaziland.

More information 
 Lucas Sithole 1958 - 1979 by F.F. Haenggi - 
 African Arts Magazine, UCLA James S. Coleman African Studies Center, Los Angeles ("Lucas Sithole by F.F. Haenggi", Review by John Povey: August, 1980, Vol. 13, No. 4: 26-27+85) - ISSN 0001-9933
 Images of Man - Contemporary S.A. Black Art and Artists, 1992 (de Jager), pp. 120/124 -  
 OUR ART 4 ONS KUNS, 1993 (Marilyn Martin) pp. 178–185 - 
 Lucas Sithole 1931-1994 - Highlights 1966-1993 (F.F. Haenggi) - 
 Full bibliography on http://www.sithole.com/Bibliography.htm
 6 Educational Documentaries on Lucas SITHOLE linked on his memorial website
 http://www.sithole.com/ (original memorial site)
 https://art-archives-southafrica.com/lucas-sithole-updates (addendum to original memorial site)

1931 births
1994 deaths
People from Springs, Gauteng
Zulu people
South African sculptors
South African people of Swazi descent
20th-century sculptors